Thomas Coningsby, 1st Earl Coningsby PC (2 November 1656 – 1 May 1729) of Hampton Court Castle, Herefordshire, was an English politician who sat in the House of Commons at various times from 1679 until 1716 when he was created a peer and sat in the House of Lords

Early life

Coningsby was the son of Humphrey Coningsby of Hampton Court, and his wife Lettice Loftus, eldest daughter of Sir Arthur Loftus of Rathfarnham, Ireland. He was the great-grandson of Sir Thomas Coningsby.

In 1679, Coningsby was elected Member of Parliament for Leominster. He represented the constituency continuously until 1710, He was re-elected in 1715 and sat until his elevation to the British peerage.

Royal allegiance

William III
Coningsby was an ardent supporter of the revolution of 1688, and opposed the Jacobite faction. Coningsby accompanied William III to Ireland, and was present at the battle of the Boyne where the King was injured. He was appointed joint receiver and Paymaster-General of the forces employed in the reduction of Ireland, and from 1690 to 1692 he acted as the junior of the three Lord Justices. He established a network of friends and allies in Ireland, notably Sir John Hely, the Chief Baron of the Irish Exchequer, who had married his sister-in-law  Meliora Gorges. It is said that he helped arrange the treaty of Limerick. His political opponents accused him of having used his position for profiteering by the embezzlement of stores, the appropriation of the estates of rebels, the sale of pardons, and dealings in illicit trade. However, the most serious charge was that he had illegally ordered the summary execution by hanging of a man named Gaffney. Gaffney was an embarrassment to Coningsby because he had witnessed a murder, the perpetrator of which had obtained an acquittal by bribing the administration.

Such charges were of slight moment so long as the royal influence was at Coningsby's back. King William created him Baron Coningsby of Clanbrassil in Ireland on 17 April 1692, and promoted him to privy councillor on 13 April 1693. King William also indicated that he would grant Coningsby a pardon under the Great Seal of Ireland for any transgressions which he might have committed while in office in Ireland.

Despite this his opponents, particularly the Earl of Bellomont and James Hamilton, sought to impeach him in the Westminster parliament in December 1693, along with his ally Sir Charles Porter. This and a similar motion in the Lords were defeated and in May 1694 he received the Royal pardon promised the previous year.

From 1695 to his death he held the office of chief steward of the city of Hereford, an appointment which involved him in a duel with Lord Chandos, another claimant of the post, "but no mischief was done". In April 1697 he received a grant under the Privy Seal of several of the crown manors in England, and in October 1698 he was again created the vice-treasurer and paymaster of the forces in Ireland.

Anne
During Queen Anne's reign he acted consistently with the whigs, but his services received slight acknowledgement even when his friends were in office. Godolphin only wrote an occasional civil letter complimenting Lord Coningsby on 'his judgment and experience' in parliamentary affairs, and it was not until October 1708 that Coningsby was sworn of Anne's privy council. He was one of the managers of Henry Sacheverell's trial, and, like most of the prominent whigs, he lost his seat in parliament as a result of the ensuing tory reaction.

George I

When George I acceded to the throne, Coningsby resumed his old position in public life, and enjoyed court favour. He was included in the select committee of twenty-one appointed to inquire into the negotiations for the treaty of Utrecht, and, according to Prior, was one of the three most inquisitive members of that body. 

As a result of their investigations, the impeachment of Bolingbroke was moved by Robert Walpole and that of Harley by Coningsby – a family feud had long existed between the two Herefordshire families of Harley and Coningsby – and Ormonde's by Stanhope. Coningsby was a staunch advocate of prosecuting Harley for High Treason, and carried news of the Commons' resolution to the House of Lords where he forcefully laid out the charges against Harley. 

Two years later Harley was unanimously discharged, but this concord of opinion was only obtained by Coningsby and some others withdrawing from the proceedings. He was well rewarded for his zeal on behalf of the Hanoverian succession. He became Lord Lieutenant of Herefordshire in November 1714, and Lord Lieutenant of Radnorshire in the following month.

Coningsby was granted a barony in the English peerage on 18 June 1716, and he was raised to a higher rank as Earl Coningsby on 30 April 1719.

Legal difficulties and death
In the later years of his life, Coningsby suffered many difficulties. He was a widower, without any male heir, and subject to innumerable lawsuits. For some severe reflections on Lord Harcourt, the Lord Chancellor, in connection with these legal worries, he was, as Swift notes in his diary, committed to the Tower of London on 27 February 1720. Coningsby's troubles in law arose from his purchase of the manors of Leominster and Marden. After elaborate investigations, he convinced himself that the lord's rights had in many instances been trespassed upon by the copyhold tenants. He caused ejectments to be brought against many persons for being in possession of estates as freehold which he claimed to be copyhold, and as these claims were resisted by the persons in possession, his last days were embittered by constant strife. His collections concerning Marden were printed in 1722–1727 in a bulky tome, without any title page, and with pagination of great irregularity, but were never published. When his right to the Marden property was disputed, all the copies of this work but a few were destroyed. Through his sharpness of temper, he was exposed to the caustic sallies of Atterbury in the House of Lords, and to the satires of Swift and Pope in their writings.

After having been in ill health for some time, Coningsby died at Hampton on 1 May 1729. and was buried at Hope-under-Dinmore church in 1729, under a marble monument, on which the child's death is depicted in striking realism.

Family

Coningsby married Barbara Gorges, daughter of Ferdinando Gorges, of Eye Manor in Herefordshire, who had been a merchant in Barbados, and his wife Meliora Hilliard. The marriage licence was applied for to the vicar-general of the Archbishop of Canterbury on 18 February 1674/5, when Coningsby was described as aged about nineteen, and Barbara Gorges was stated to be about eighteen years old. Gorges, though he claimed to have made a fortune in Barbados, was generally considered to be a financial schemer who contrived to marry his eldest daughter to Coningsby to secure for himself some of the Coningsby estates. Gorges' financial scheming caused ruinous loss to his son-in-law, from which he never recovered and he eventually divorced Barbara Gorges by whom he had four daughters and three sons. His grandson by this marriage succeeded to the Irish barony, but died without issue on 18 December 1729.

His second wife, whom he married in April 1698, was Lady Frances Jones, daughter of Richard Jones, 1st Earl of Ranelagh, by whom he had one son, Richard, who died at Hampton on 2 April 1708 when two years old, choked by a cherrystone; and two daughters, Margaret and Frances. The second countess was buried at Hope-under-Dinmore on 23 February 1715, aged 42.

The grant of his earldom contained a remainder for the eldest daughter of his second marriage. Her issue male, John, the only child of this daughter, Margaret Newton, 2nd Countess Coningsby, by her husband Sir Michael Newton, died an infant, the victim of an accidental fall, said to have been caused through the fright of its nurse at seeing an ape, and on the mother's death in 1761 the title became extinct. Frances, the younger daughter of Lord Coningsby married Sir Charles Hanbury Williams, a well-known satirical poet, and was buried in the chapel of St. Erasmus, Westminster Abbey, in December 1781.

Hampton Court Castle passed via the younger daughter Frances to his great-grandson George Capell-Coningsby, 5th Earl of Essex.

Notes

Bibliography
 Rogers, Pat. The Life and Times of Thomas, Lord Coningsby: The Whig Hangman and his Victims. A&C Black, 2011.

References

|-

|-

1656 births
1729 deaths
Lord-Lieutenants of Herefordshire
Lord-Lieutenants of Radnorshire
Coningsby, Thomas Coningsby, 1st Baron
Members of the Privy Council of Great Britain
Members of the Privy Council of Ireland
Williamite military personnel of the Williamite War in Ireland
Earls in the Peerage of Great Britain
English MPs 1680–1681
English MPs 1681
English MPs 1685–1687
English MPs 1689–1690
English MPs 1690–1695
English MPs 1695–1698
English MPs 1698–1700
English MPs 1701
English MPs 1701–1702
English MPs 1702–1705
English MPs 1705–1707
British MPs 1707–1708
British MPs 1708–1710
British MPs 1715–1722
Peers of Ireland created by William III
Peers of Great Britain created by George I
People expelled from the Privy Council of Great Britain